Valleys of Neptune is a posthumous compilation album by the American rock musician Jimi Hendrix. Released in the United States on March 9, 2010, the album was promoted as having "12 previously unreleased studio recordings", including the title track, "one of the most sought after of all of Hendrix's commercially unavailable recordings".

The tracks on Valleys of Neptune were largely self-produced by Hendrix, and received extra posthumous production from Janie Hendrix, Eddie Kramer and John McDermott. Recorded mostly in 1969 following the release of Electric Ladyland, the album predominantly features the original line-up of the Jimi Hendrix Experience: vocalist and guitarist Hendrix, bass guitarist Noel Redding and drummer Mitch Mitchell. The lead single released from the album was "Valleys of Neptune", on February 1, 2010, followed by "Bleeding Heart" on March 1; music videos were produced for both songs.

Background
The majority of the tracks on Valleys of Neptune were recorded in early 1969, while Hendrix was experimenting with songs for his unfinished fourth album, following the successful release of Electric Ladyland in September 1968. Numerous versions have been released, both officially and otherwise, and the majority of the "previously unreleased" recordings present on the 2010 album had been released in one form or another before, albeit sometimes in inferior quality or different versions.

Album cover
The album artwork is based on a painting by Hendrix himself in 1957. "He went through a phase doing watercolors at school and this was one of the 110 drawings of his that our father kept. When I saw this one he did in 1957, it screamed 'Valleys of Neptune' to me so we knew we'd use it for this project," said his step-sister, Janie. The album artwork is a mix of his painting and a Linda McCartney photograph of him with a blue tint.

Critical reception

Valleys of Neptune received generally positive reviews from critics. At Metacritic, which assigns a normalized rating out of 100 to reviews from mainstream publications, it received an average score of 68, based on 15 reviews. In Rolling Stone, critic Will Hermes found the music beautiful and exciting, while writing, "Are these tracks 'finished' as Hendrix would've intended? Probably not. But as a glimpse of the guitarist extending his reach beyond the Experience trio, it's thrilling.". Greg Kot, writing for the Chicago Tribune, called it "a sharp snapshot of a musical genius in the studio during a period of transition". Ludovic Hunter-Tilney from the Financial Times called the album "a cut above the many posthumous cash-ins released in [Hendrix's] name."

In the Los Angeles Times, Ann Powers was less enthusiastic and felt "fans will be fascinated by these bluesy riffs with the Experience, but this album of unreleased material from the archives doesn't convey much that was unknown." Q found it "lighter sonically" than Hendrix's better known work and ultimately of "limited appeal".

Track listing

Recording details
All recording details are included in the Valleys of Neptune booklet

Track 1 recorded on April 7, 9, 14 and May 17, 1969, at Record Plant Studios, New York City
Track 2 recorded on September 23, 1969, and May 15, 1970, at Record Plant
Track 3 recorded on April 24, 1969, at Record Plant
Track 4 recorded on April 7, 1969, at Record Plant
Track 5 recorded on May 5, 1967, at Olympic Studios and June 5, 1987, at AIR Studios, London
Track 6 recorded on February 16, 1969, at Olympic
Track 7 recorded on February 16, 1969, at Olympic and June 5, 1987, at AIR
Track 8 recorded on April 14, 1969, at Record Plant
Tracks 9 and 10 recorded on February 17, 1969, at Olympic
Track 11 recorded on April 7, 1969, at Record Plant
Track 12 recorded on February 16, 1969, at Olympic and June 5, 1987, at AIR
Track 13 recorded on April 3, 1969, at Olmstead Studios, New York City
Track 14 recorded on February 14, 1969, at Olympic

Personnel

Primary musicians
Jimi Hendrix – vocals, guitars, production on all tracks except 5, front cover painting
Mitch Mitchell – drums on all tracks except 3
Noel Redding – bass guitar on all tracks except 1, 2 and 3, backing vocals on track 9
Billy Cox – bass guitar on tracks 1, 2 and 3
Additional musicians
Rocky Dzidzornu – percussion on tracks 6 and 12
Roger Chapman – backing vocals on track 1
Andy Fairweather Low – backing vocals on track 1
Juma Sultan – percussion on track 2
Rocky Isaac – drums on track 3
Chris Grimes – tambourine on track 3
Al Marks – maracas on track 3

Original production personnel
Eddie Kramer – posthumous production, mixing, engineering on tracks 1, 2, 5 and 14
Chas Chandler – production on track 5
George Chkiantz – engineering on tracks 6, 7, 9, 10, 12 and 13
Gary Kellgren – engineering on tracks 1, 3 and 8
Jack Adams – engineering on track 2
Posthumous production personnel
Janie Hendrix – production
John McDermott – production, essay
Chandler Harrod – engineering assistance
Rick Kwan – additional engineering
Derik Lee – additional engineering
Charlie Stavish – additional engineering
Aaron Walk – additional engineering
George Marino – mastering

Graphic personnel
Phil Yarnall – graphic design
Linda McCartney – front cover photography
James Davenport – back cover photography, booklet photography
Jerry Schatzberg – booklet photography
Jonathan Stathakis – booklet photography
Graham F. Page – booklet photography
John Sullivan – booklet photography
Ulvis Alberts – booklet photography
Willis Hogan Jr. – booklet photography
Peter Riches – booklet photography

Charts

Weekly charts

Year-end charts

Certifications

References

Jimi Hendrix compilation albums
2010 compilation albums
Compilation albums published posthumously
Albums produced by Eddie Kramer
Albums produced by Chas Chandler
Legacy Recordings compilation albums